Another Level is the self-titled debut album by English boy band Another Level, released on 9 November 1998 in the United Kingdom by Northwestside Records. It includes the number one single "Freak Me", originally sung by Silk, as well as the top 10 singles "Be Alone No More", "Guess I Was a Fool" and "I Want You for Myself". The album peaked at number thirteen in the United Kingdom, where it was certified platinum on 9 April 1999.

Track listing

Another Level: Remixed

Charts and certifications

Weekly charts

Year-end charts

Certifications

References 

1998 debut albums
Another Level (band) albums